Dear Uge is a Philippine television comedy anthology broadcast by GMA Network. Starring Eugene Domingo and Divine Aucina, it premiered on February 14, 2016 on the network's Sunday Grande sa Hapon line up replacing Wowowin. The show concluded on February 13, 2022. It was replaced by The Best Ka! on its timeslot.

Premise
Urbana Genoveva Esperanza hosts a web show titled as Dear Uge where she features love stories. Joining her in the show is her feeling charming sidekick, Devine.

Cast and characters

Main cast
 Eugene Domingo as Urbana Genoveva "Uge" Esperanza
 Divine Aucina as Divine

Recurring cast
 Skelly Clarkson as Hercules 
 Jessah Nicole as Mercy 
 Dave Bornea as Diego 
 Tery Gian 
 Euwenn Aleta 
 Jo Berry as So Very 
 Jelai Andres 
 Atak Arana as Kata / Kerry 
 Jak Roberto as Berto 
 Aaron Yanga as Darak

Production
Principal photography was halted in March 2020 due to the enhanced community quarantine in Luzon caused by the COVID-19 pandemic. The show resumed its programming on August 23, 2020.

Ratings
According to AGB Nielsen Philippines' Mega Manila household television ratings, the pilot episode of Dear Uge earned a 15% rating.

Accolades

References

External links
 
 

2016 Philippine television series debuts
2022 Philippine television series endings
Filipino-language television shows
GMA Network original programming
Philippine anthology television series
Television productions suspended due to the COVID-19 pandemic
Television shows set in the Philippines